Latreillia is a genus of crabs in the family Latreilliidae, comprising five species:
Latreillia elegans Roux, 1830
Latreillia metanesa Williams, 1982
Latreillia pennifera Alcock, 1900
Latreillia valida De Haan, 1839
Latreillia williamsi Melo, 1990
The name Latreillia honors Pierre André Latreille. A genus of flies was also given the same name and, as a junior homonym, was renamed Belvosia.

References

Dromiacea
Decapod genera